Local elections were held in the province of Zamboanga del Norte of the Philippines, on May 13, 2019 as part of the 2019 general election. Voters selected candidates for all local positions: a municipal and city mayor, vice mayor and councilors, as well as members of the Sangguniang Panlalawigan, the governor, vice governor and representatives for the three districts of Zamboanga del Norte.

Provincial elections 
All incumbents are expressed in italics.

Governor 
Incumbent Governor Berto Uy is running for re-election. A candidate for governor by the name of Roberto Escobido Uy participated and entered in the race. On April 4, 2019, the Commission on Elections issued a resolution making Escobido Uy as a nuisance candidate because it bears the same name and same nickname "Berto" in order to confuse the voters. On November 26, 2020, the Supreme Court of the Philippines upheld COMELEC's decision on disqualifying Escobido Uy.

Vice governor 
Incumbent Vice-Governor Senen Angeles is running for re-election.

Congressional elections

1st District 
Incumbent Representative Bullet Jalosjos is term-limited and ineligible for re-election; his party nominated Romeo Jalosjos Jr. for the position. His opponent is Pinpin Uy, son of incumbent governor Berto Uy and former mayor of Polanco, Zamboanga del Norte.

2nd District 
Incumbent Representative Glona Labadlabad is running for re-election.

3rd District 
Incumbent Representative Gani Amatong is running for re-election.

Provincial board elections

1st District 
City: Dapitan
Municipalities: La Libertad, Mutia, Piñan, Polanco, Rizal, Sergio Osmeña Sr., Sibutad

Incumbent Board Member Anabel "Bebing" Jalosjos is eligible for re-election but opted to run for mayor of Sibutad.

2nd District 
City: Dipolog
Municipalities: Jose Dalman, Katipunan, Manukan, President Manuel A. Roxas, Siayan, Sindangan

3rd District 
Municipalities: Bacungan, Baliguian, Godod, Gutalac, Kalawit, Labason, Liloy, Salug, Sibuco, Siocon, Sirawai, Tampilisan

Incumbent Board Member Angel Carloto is eligible for re-election but opted not to participate. Conkee Buctuan is his party's nominee.

City and municipal elections

1st District

Dapitan 
Incumbent Mayor Rosalina "Nene" Jalosjos-Johnson is running for re-election, and incumbent Vice Mayor Ruben Cad opted not to participate. Incumbent Councilor Jimboy Chan is the party's nominee for Vice Mayor. Jalosjos's opponent is former Mayor of Dipolog Evelyn Uy. Uy's candidacy was questioned over her residency and the Dapitan election registration board disqualified her, but the Regional Trial Court in Dipolog upheld her candidacy and ruled that she should be included in the list of candidates.

| colspan="7" style="background:black;"|

La Libertad

Mutia 
Incumbent Mayor Arthur Tenorio is term-limited, and opted to run for Vice Mayor. His wife, incumbent Councilor Melba Tenorio, was fielded as their Mayoral candidate.

Piñan 
Incumbent Vice Mayor Louida Belangoy opted to run for mayor. Her party fielded incumbent Councilor Deogracias "Junjun" Cimafranca for Vice Mayor.

Polanco 
Incumbent Sangguniang Bayan members Patty Triambulo and Dario Mandantes, who were both eligible for re-election, opted to run for Municipal Mayor and Vice Mayor respectively.

Rizal

Sergio Osmeña Sr.

Sibutad

2nd District

Dipolog 
Incumbent Mayor Darel Dexter Uy is running for re-election. His opponents were former Provincial Governor Lando Yebes, and former Jalosjos-ally Clyde Naong.

| colspan="7" style="background:black;"|

Jose Dalman (Ponot)

Katipunan

Manukan

President Manuel A. Roxas 
Incumbent Vice Mayor Leonor Alberto is term-limited and opted to run for Sangguniang Bayan member. Alberto's party fielded incumbent SB member Ismael "Junior" Rengquijo as vice mayoral candidate.

Siayan 
Incumbent Mayor Flora Villarosa, who was on her third and final term as mayor, was suspended by the Provincial Board for grave misconduct and abuse of authority because of her murder allegations. Vice Mayor Daisy Limbang was to serve as mayor, but this caused a commotion between Villarosa and Limbang with their respective allies all along. Being ineligible for re-election, Villarosa opted to run for 2nd District Representative, and her party fielded Josecor Gepolongca to run for mayor against Vice Mayor Limbang.

Sindangan 
Incumbent Mayor Nilo Florentino "Boy" Sy is term-limited and ineligible for re-election, and run for Vice Mayor; former Representative Dodoy Labadlabad is chosen as the party's nominee. His opponents are former Armed Forces Chief of Staff Gen. Alexander Yano, and Ritche "Bong" Macias.

3rd District

Baliguian

Godod

Gutalac

Kalawit

Labason 
Incumbent Vice Mayor Riza Melicor opted to run for Mayor.

Leon B. Postigo (Bacungan)

Liloy 
Mayor Felixberto "Dodong" Bolando, who was elected Mayor in 2016, passed away in 2018, and Vice Mayor Roberto "Jun" Uy (no relation to incumbent Governor Berto Uy) took Bolando's place as Mayor of Liloy.

Salug 
Incumbent Mayor Jeffrey Lim is term-limited and opted to run for Provincial Board Member. His party fielded Jehan Lim as their mayoralty candidate.

Sibuco 
Incumbent Mayor Norbideiri "Bong" Edding opted to run for Third District Representative.

Siocon

Sirawai

Tampilisan

References

Notes

External links
Certified List of Candidates - Region IX Zamboanga del Norte, May 13, 2019 National and Local Elections (Commission on Elections)
Consolidated List of All Substitute Candidates for Local Positions - Region IX Zamboanga del Norte, May 13, 2019 National and Local Elections
Certified List of Elected City/Municipal Candidates, May 13, 2019 National and Local Elections (Commission on Elections)
Certified List of Elected City/Municipal Candidates with Votes Obtained and Date of Proclamation, May 09, 2016 National and Local Elections (Commission on Elections)

2019 Philippine local elections
Elections in Zamboanga del Norte
Politics of Zamboanga del Norte
May 2019 events in the Philippines